James Gamble (January 28, 1809 – February 22, 1883) was a Democratic member of the U.S. House of Representatives from Pennsylvania.
He served two consecutive terms representing two different districts from 1851 to 1855.

Biography
James Gamble was born in Jersey Shore, Pennsylvania.  He attended the common schools and Jersey Shore Academy.  He studied law, was admitted to the bar in December 1833 and commenced practice in Jersey Shore.  He served as Lycoming County, Pennsylvania, treasurer from 1834 to 1836.  He resumed the practice of law in Jersey Shore, and served as a member of the Pennsylvania House of Representatives in 1841 and 1842.

Congress
Gamble was elected as a Democrat to the Thirty-second and Thirty-third Congresses.  He served as president judge of Clearfield County, Pennsylvania, in 1859 and 1860, and president judge of the court of common pleas of Lycoming County from 1868 to 1878.  He died in Williamsport, Pennsylvania, in 1883.  Interment in Wildwood Cemetery.

Sources

The Political Graveyard

1809 births
1883 deaths
Democratic Party members of the Pennsylvania House of Representatives
Pennsylvania lawyers
Democratic Party members of the United States House of Representatives from Pennsylvania
19th-century American politicians
19th-century American judges
19th-century American lawyers
Judges of the Pennsylvania Courts of Common Pleas